Senator Hackett may refer to:

Bob Hackett (born 1949), Ohio State Senate
Thomas C. Hackett (died 1851), Georgia State Senate